Zuurman is a Dutch surname. Notable people with the surname include:

Bert Zuurman (born 1973), Dutch footballer
Mike Zuurman (born 1974), Dutch biologist and programmer

Dutch-language surnames